Springfield School is a co-educational secondary school located in the Drayton area of Portsmouth in the English county of Hampshire.

It was previously a community school administered by Portsmouth City Council, and held specialist Technology College status. In April 2017 Springfield School converted to academy status and is now sponsored by The De Curci Trust.

Notable former pupils
Andy Perry, rugby union player 
Katy Sexton, swimmer

References

External links
Springfield School official website

Secondary schools in Portsmouth
Academies in Portsmouth